Vladimir Vladimirovich Nabokov (2 July 1977), also known by the pen name Vladimir Sirin, was a Russian-American novelist, poet, translator, and entomologist. Born in Imperial Russia in 1899, Nabokov wrote his first nine novels in Russian (1926–1938) while living in Berlin, where he met his wife. He achieved international acclaim and prominence after moving to the United States, where he began writing in English. Nabokov became an American citizen in 1945 and lived mostly on the East Coast before returning to Europe in 1961, where he settled in Montreux, Switzerland.

From 1948 to 1959, Nabokov was a professor of Russian literature at Cornell University.

Nabokov's 1955 novel Lolita ranked fourth on Modern Library's list of the 100 best 20th-century novels in 2007 and is considered one of the greatest 20th-century works of literature. Nabokov's Pale Fire, published in 1962, was ranked 53rd on the same list. His memoir, Speak, Memory, published in 1951, is considered among the greatest nonfiction works of the 20th century, placing eighth on Random House's ranking of 20th century works. Nabokov was a seven-time finalist for the National Book Award for Fiction. He also was an expert lepidopterist and composer of chess problems.

Early life and education

Russia

Nabokov was born on 22 April 1899 (10 April 1899 Old Style) in Saint Petersburg to a wealthy and prominent family of the Russian nobility. His family traced its roots to the 14th-century Tatar prince Nabok Murza, who entered into the service of the Tsars, and from whom the family name is derived. His father was Vladimir Dmitrievich Nabokov (1870–1922), a liberal lawyer, statesman, and journalist, and his mother was the heiress Yelena Ivanovna née Rukavishnikova, the granddaughter of a millionaire gold-mine owner. His father was a leader of the pre-Revolutionary liberal Constitutional Democratic Party, and wrote numerous books and articles about criminal law and politics. His cousins included the composer Nicolas Nabokov. His paternal grandfather, Dmitry Nabokov (1827–1904), was Russia's Justice Minister during the reign of Alexander II. His paternal grandmother was the Baltic German Baroness Maria von Korff (1842–1926). Through his father's German ancestry, Nabokov was related to the composer Carl Heinrich Graun (1704–1759).

Vladimir was the family's eldest and favorite child, with four younger siblings: Sergey (1900–45), Olga (1903–78), Elena (1906–2000), and Kirill (1912–64). Sergey was killed in a Nazi concentration camp in 1945 after publicly denouncing Hitler's regime. Writer Ayn Rand recalled Olga (her close friend at Stoiunina Gymnasium) as a supporter of constitutional monarchy who first awakened Rand's interest in politics. Elena, who in later years became Vladimir's favorite sibling, published her correspondence with him in 1985. She was an important source for later biographers of Nabokov.

Nabokov spent his childhood and youth in Saint Petersburg and at the country estate Vyra near Siverskaya, south of the city. His childhood, which he called "perfect" and "cosmopolitan", was remarkable in several ways. The family spoke Russian, English, and French in their household, and Nabokov was trilingual from an early age. He related that the first English book his mother read to him was Misunderstood (1869) by Florence Montgomery. Much to his patriotic father's disappointment, Nabokov could read and write in English before he could in Russian. In his memoir Speak, Memory, Nabokov recalls numerous details of his privileged childhood. His ability to recall in vivid detail memories of his past was a boon to him during his permanent exile, providing a theme that runs from his first book Mary to later works such as Ada or Ardor: A Family Chronicle. While the family was nominally Orthodox, it had little religious fervor. Vladimir was not forced to attend church after he lost interest.

In 1916, Nabokov inherited the estate Rozhdestveno, next to Vyra, from his uncle Vasily Ivanovich Rukavishnikov ("Uncle Ruka" in Speak, Memory). He lost it in the October Revolution one year later; this was the only house he ever owned.

Nabokov's adolescence was the period in which he made his first serious literary endeavors. In 1916, he published his first book, Stikhi ("Poems"), a collection of 68 Russian poems. At the time he was attending Tenishev school in Saint Petersburg, where his literature teacher Vladimir Vasilievich Gippius had criticized his literary accomplishments. Some time after the publication of Stikhi, Zinaida Gippius, renowned poet and first cousin of his teacher, told Nabokov's father at a social event, "Please tell your son that he will never be a writer."

After the 1917 February Revolution, Nabokov's father became a secretary of the Russian Provisional Government in Saint Petersburg.

October Revolution
After the October Revolution, the family was forced to flee the city for Crimea, at first not expecting to be away for very long. They lived at a friend's estate and in September 1918 moved to Livadiya, at the time part of the Ukrainian Republic. Nabokov's father became a minister of justice in the Crimean Regional Government.

University of Cambridge
After the withdrawal of the German Army in November 1918 and the defeat of the White Army (early 1919), the Nabokovs sought exile in western Europe, along with many other Russian refugees. They settled briefly in England, where Nabokov gained admittance to the University of Cambridge, one of the world's most prestigious universities, where he attended Trinity College and studied zoology and later Slavic and Romance languages.
His examination results on the first part of the Tripos exam, taken at the end of his second year, were a starred first. He took the second part of the exam in his fourth year just after his father's death, and feared he might fail it. But his exam was marked second-class. His final examination result also ranked second-class, and his BA was conferred in 1922. Nabokov later drew on his Cambridge experiences to write several works, including the novels Glory and The Real Life of Sebastian Knight. 

At Cambridge, one journalist wrote in 2014, "the coats-of-arms on the windows of his room protected him from the cold and from the melancholy over the recent loss of his country. It was in this city, in his moments of solitude, accompanied by King Lear, Le Morte d’Arthur, The Strange Case of Dr. Jekyll and Mr. Hyde or Ulysses, that Nabokov made the firm decision to become a Russian writer."

Career

Berlin (1922–37)
In 1920, Nabokov's family moved to Berlin, where his father set up the émigré newspaper Rul''' ("Rudder"). Nabokov followed them to Berlin two years later, after completing his studies at Cambridge.

In March 1922, Russian monarchists Pyotr Shabelsky-Bork and Sergey Taboritsky shot and killed Nabokov's father in Berlin as he was shielding their target, Pavel Milyukov, a leader of the Constitutional Democratic Party-in-exile. Shortly after his father's death, Nabokov's mother and sister moved to Prague. Nabokov drew upon his father's death repeatedly in his fiction. On one interpretation of his novel Pale Fire, an assassin kills the poet John Shade when his target is a fugitive European monarch.

Nabokov stayed in Berlin, where he had become a recognised poet and writer in Russian within the émigré community; he published under the nom de plume V. Sirin (a reference to the fabulous bird of Russian folklore). To supplement his scant writing income, he taught languages and gave tennis and boxing lessons. Dieter E. Zimmer has written of Nabokov's 15 Berlin years, "he never became fond of Berlin, and at the end intensely disliked it. He lived within the lively Russian community of Berlin that was more or less self-sufficient, staying on after it had disintegrated because he had nowhere else to go to. He knew little German. He knew few Germans except for landladies, shopkeepers, and immigration officials at the police headquarters."

Marriage
In 1922, Nabokov became engaged to Svetlana Siewert, but she broke the engagement off early in 1923 when her parents worried whether he could provide for her. In May 1923, he met Véra Evseyevna Slonim, a Russian-Jewish woman, at a charity ball in Berlin. They married in April 1925. Their only child, Dmitri, was born in 1934.

In the course of 1936, Véra lost her job because of the increasingly anti-Semitic environment; Sergey Taboritsky was appointed deputy head of Germany's Russian-émigré bureau; and Nabokov began seeking a job in the English-speaking world. 

France (1937–40)
In 1937, Nabokov left Germany for France, where he had a short affair with Irina Guadanini, also a Russian émigrée. His family followed him to France, making en route their last visit to Prague, then spent time in Cannes, Menton, Cap d'Antibes, and Fréjus, finally settling in Paris. This city also had a Russian émigré community.

In 1939, in Paris, Nabokov wrote the 55-page novella The Enchanter, his final work of Russian fiction. He later called it "the first little throb of Lolita."

In May 1940, the Nabokovs fled the advancing German troops, reaching the United States via the SS Champlain. Nabokov's brother Sergei did not leave France, and he died at the Neuengamme concentration camp on 9 January 1945.

United States

New York City (1940–41)
The Nabokovs settled in Manhattan, and Vladimir began volunteer work as an entomologist at the American Museum of Natural History.

Wellesley College (1941–48)
Nabokov joined the staff of Wellesley College in 1941 as resident lecturer in comparative literature. The position, created specifically for him, provided an income and free time to write creatively and pursue his lepidoptery. Nabokov is remembered as the founder of Wellesley's Russian department. The Nabokovs resided in Wellesley, Massachusetts, during the 1941–42 academic year. In September 1942, they moved to nearby Cambridge, where they lived until June 1948. Following a lecture tour through the United States, Nabokov returned to Wellesley for the 1944–45 academic year as a lecturer in Russian. In 1945, he became a naturalized citizen of the United States. He served through the 1947–48 term as Wellesley's one-man Russian department, offering courses in Russian language and literature. His classes were popular, due as much to his unique teaching style as to the wartime interest in all things Russian. At the same time he was the de facto curator of lepidoptery at Harvard University's Museum of Comparative Zoology. 

Cornell University (1948–59)
After being encouraged by Morris Bishop, Nabokov left Wellesley in 1948 to teach Russian and European literature at Cornell University, where he taught until 1959. Among his students at Cornell was future U.S. Supreme Court Justice Ruth Bader Ginsburg, who later identified Nabokov as a major influence on her development as a writer.

Nabokov wrote Lolita while traveling on the butterfly-collection trips in the western U.S. that he undertook every summer. Véra acted as "secretary, typist, editor, proofreader, translator and bibliographer; his agent, business manager, legal counsel and chauffeur; his research assistant, teaching assistant and professorial understudy"; when Nabokov attempted to burn unfinished drafts of Lolita, Véra stopped him. He called her the best-humored woman he had ever known.

In June 1953, Nabokov and his family went to Ashland, Oregon. There he finished Lolita and began writing the novel Pnin. He roamed the nearby mountains looking for butterflies, and wrote a poem called Lines Written in Oregon. On 1 October 1953, he and his family returned to Ithaca, where he later taught the young writer Thomas Pynchon.

Montreux (1961–77)

After the great financial success of Lolita, Nabokov returned to Europe and devoted himself to writing. In 1961, he and Véra moved to the Montreux Palace Hotel in Montreux, Switzerland, where he remained until the end of his life. From his sixth-floor quarters, he conducted his business and took tours to the Alps, Corsica, and Sicily to hunt butterflies.

Death
Nabokov died on 2 July 1977 in Montreux. His remains were cremated and buried at Clarens cemetery in Montreux.

At the time of his death, he was working on a novel titled The Original of Laura. Véra and Dmitri, who were entrusted with Nabokov's literary executorship, ignored Nabokov's request to burn the incomplete manuscript and published it in 2009.

Works

Critical reception and writing style

Nabokov is known as one of the leading prose stylists of the 20th century; his first writings were in Russian, but he achieved his greatest fame with the novels he wrote in English. As a trilingual (also writing in French, see Mademoiselle O) master, he has been compared to Joseph Conrad, but Nabokov disliked both the comparison and Conrad's work. He lamented to the critic Edmund Wilson, "I am too old to change Conradically"—which John Updike later called "itself a jest of genius". This lament came in 1941, when Nabokov had been an apprentice American for less than one year.  Later, in a November 1950 letter to Wilson, Nabokov offers a solid, non-comic appraisal: "Conrad knew how to handle readymade English better than I; but I know better the other kind. He never sinks to the depths of my solecisms, but neither does he scale my verbal peaks." Nabokov translated many of his own early works into English, sometimes in collaboration with his son, Dmitri. His trilingual upbringing had a profound influence on his art.

Nabokov himself translated into Russian two books he originally wrote in English, Conclusive Evidence and Lolita. The "translation" of Conclusive Evidence was made because Nabokov felt that the English version was imperfect. Writing the book, he noted that he needed to translate his own memories into English and to spend time explaining things that are well known in Russia; he decided to rewrite the book in his native language before making the final version, Speak, Memory (Nabokov first wanted to name it "Speak, Mnemosyne"). Nabokov was a proponent of individualism, and rejected concepts and ideologies that curtailed individual freedom and expression, such as totalitarianism in its various forms, as well as Sigmund Freud's psychoanalysis. Poshlost, or as he transcribed it, poshlust, is disdained and frequently mocked in his works. On translating Lolita, Nabokov writes, "I imagined that in some distant future somebody might produce a Russian version of Lolita. I trained my inner telescope upon that particular point in the distant future and I saw that every paragraph, pock-marked as it is with pitfalls, could lend itself to hideous mistranslation. In the hands of a harmful drudge, the Russian version of Lolita would be entirely degraded and botched by vulgar paraphrases or blunders. So I decided to translate it myself."

Nabokov's creative processes involved writing sections of text on hundreds of index cards, which he expanded into paragraphs and chapters and rearranged to form the structure of his novels, a process that many screenwriters later adopted.

Nabokov published under the pseudonym Vladimir Sirin in the 1920s to 1940s, occasionally to mask his identity from critics. He also makes cameo appearances in some of his novels, such as the character Vivian Darkbloom (an anagram of "Vladimir Nabokov"), who appears in both Lolita and Ada, or Ardor, and the character Blavdak Vinomori (another anagram of Nabokov's name) in King, Queen, Knave. Sirin is referenced as a different émigré author in his memoir and is also referenced in Pnin.

Nabokov is noted for his complex plots, clever word play, daring metaphors, and prose style capable of both parody and intense lyricism. He gained both fame and notoriety with Lolita (1955), which recounts a grown man's consuming passion for a 12-year-old girl. This and his other novels, particularly Pale Fire (1962), won him a place among the greatest novelists of the 20th century. His longest novel, which met with a mixed response, is Ada (1969). He devoted more time to the composition of it than to any other. Nabokov's fiction is characterized by linguistic playfulness. For example, his short story "The Vane Sisters" is famous in part for its acrostic final paragraph, in which the first letters of each word spell out a message from beyond the grave. Another of his short stories, "Signs and Symbols", features a character suffering from an imaginary illness called "Referential Mania", in which the afflicted perceives a world of environmental objects exchanging coded messages.

Nabokov's stature as a literary critic is founded largely on his four-volume translation of and commentary on Alexander Pushkin's Eugene Onegin published in 1964. The commentary ends with an appendix titled Notes on Prosody, which has developed a reputation of its own. It stemmed from his observation that while Pushkin's iambic tetrameters had been a part of Russian literature for a fairly short two centuries, they were clearly understood by the Russian prosodists. On the other hand, he viewed the much older English iambic tetrameters as muddled and poorly documented. In his own words:I have been forced to invent a simple little terminology of my own, explain its application to English verse forms, and indulge in certain rather copious details of classification before even tackling the limited object of these notes to my translation of Pushkin's Eugene Onegin, an object that boils down to very little—in comparison to the forced preliminaries—namely, to a few things that the non-Russian student of Russian literature must know in regard to Russian prosody in general and to Eugene Onegin in particular.

Cornell University lectures
Nabokov's lectures at Cornell University, as collected in Lectures on Literature, reveal his controversial ideas concerning art. He firmly believed that novels should not aim to teach and that readers should not merely empathize with characters but that a 'higher' aesthetic enjoyment should be attained, partly by paying great attention to details of style and structure. He detested what he saw as 'general ideas' in novels, and so when teaching Ulysses, for example, he would insist students keep an eye on where the characters were in Dublin (with the aid of a map) rather than teaching the complex Irish history that many critics see as being essential to an understanding of the novel. In 2010, Kitsch magazine, a student publication at Cornell, published a piece that focused on student reflections on his lectures and also explored Nabokov's long relationship with Playboy. Nabokov also wanted his students to describe the details of the novels rather than a narrative of the story and was very strict when it came to grading. As Edward Jay Epstein described his experience in Nabokov's classes, Nabokov made it clear from the very first lectures that he had little interest in fraternizing with students, who would be known not by their name but by their seat number.

Influence

The Russian literary critic Yuly Aykhenvald was an early admirer of Nabokov, citing in particular his ability to imbue objects with life: "he saturates trivial things with life, sense and psychology and gives a mind to objects; his refined senses notice colorations and nuances, smells and sounds, and everything acquires an unexpected meaning and truth under his gaze and through his words." The critic James Wood argues that Nabokov's use of descriptive detail proved an "overpowering, and not always very fruitful, influence on two or three generations after him", including authors such as Martin Amis and John Updike. While a student at Cornell in the 1950s, Thomas Pynchon attended several of Nabokov's lectures and alluded to Lolita in chapter six of his novel The Crying of Lot 49 (1966), in which Serge, countertenor in the band the Paranoids, sings:
What chance has a lonely surfer boy
For the love of a surfer chick,
With all these Humbert Humbert cats
Coming on so big and sick?
For me, my baby was a woman,
For him she's just another nymphet.

Pynchon's prose style was influenced by Nabokov's preference for actualism over realism. Of the authors who came to prominence during Nabokov's life, John Banville, Don DeLillo, Salman Rushdie, and Edmund White were all influenced by him. The novelist John Hawkes took inspiration from Nabokov and considered himself his follower. Nabokov's story "Signs and Symbols" was on the reading list for Hawkes's writing students at Brown University. "A writer who truly and greatly sustains us is Vladimir Nabokov," Hawkes said in a 1964 interview.

Several authors who came to prominence in the 1990s and 2000s have also cited Nabokov's work as a literary influence. Aleksandar Hemon, whose wordplay and sense of the absurd are often compared to Nabokov's, has acknowledged the latter's impact on his writing. Pulitzer Prize-winning novelist Michael Chabon listed Lolita and Pale Fire among the "books that, I thought, changed my life when I read them", and has said, "Nabokov's English combines aching lyricism with dispassionate precision in a way that seems to render every human emotion in all its intensity but never with an ounce of schmaltz or soggy language". Pulitzer Prize winner Jeffrey Eugenides has said, "Nabokov has always been and remains one of my favorite writers. He's able to juggle ten balls where most people can juggle three or four."  T. Coraghessan Boyle has said that "Nabokov's playfulness and the ravishing beauty of his prose are ongoing influences" on his writing. Bilingual author and critic Maxim D. Shrayer, who came to the U.S. as a refugee from the USSR, described reading Nabokov in 1987 as "my culture shock": "I was reading Nabokov and waiting for America." Boston Globe book critic David Mehegan wrote that Shrayer's Waiting for America "is one of those memoirs, like Nabokov's Speak, Memory, that is more about feeling than narrative."

Nabokov appears in W. G. Sebald's 1993 novel The Emigrants.

Adaptations
The song cycle "Sing, Poetry" on the 2011 contemporary classical album Troika comprises settings of Russian and English versions of three of Nabokov's poems by such composers as Jay Greenberg, Michael Schelle and Lev Zhurbin.

Entomology
Nabokov's interest in entomology was inspired by books by Maria Sibylla Merian he found in the attic of his family's country home in Vyra. Throughout an extensive career of collecting, he never learned to drive a car, and depended on his wife to take him to collecting sites. During the 1940s, as a research fellow in zoology, he was responsible for organizing the butterfly collection of Harvard University's Museum of Comparative Zoology. His writings in this area were highly technical. This, combined with his specialty in the relatively unspectacular tribe Polyommatini of the family Lycaenidae, has left this facet of his life little explored by most admirers of his literary works. He described the Karner blue. The genus Nabokovia was named after him in honor of this work, as were a number of butterfly and moth species (e.g., many species in the genera Madeleinea and Pseudolucia bear epithets alluding to Nabokov or names from his novels). In 1967, Nabokov commented: "The pleasures and rewards of literary inspiration are nothing beside the rapture of discovering a new organ under the microscope or an undescribed species on a mountainside in Iran or Peru. It is not improbable that had there been no revolution in Russia, I would have devoted myself entirely to lepidopterology and never written any novels at all."

The paleontologist and essayist Stephen Jay Gould discussed Nabokov's lepidoptery in his essay "No Science Without Fancy, No Art Without Facts: The Lepidoptery of Vladimir Nabokov" (reprinted in I Have Landed). Gould notes that Nabokov was occasionally a scientific "stick-in-the-mud". For example, Nabokov never accepted that genetics or the counting of chromosomes could be a valid way to distinguish species of insects, and relied on the traditional (for lepidopterists) microscopic comparison of their genitalia.

The Harvard Museum of Natural History, which now contains the Museum of Comparative Zoology, still possesses Nabokov's "genitalia cabinet", where the author stored his collection of male blue butterfly genitalia. "Nabokov was a serious taxonomist," says museum staff writer Nancy Pick, author of The Rarest of the Rare: Stories Behind the Treasures at the Harvard Museum of Natural History. "He actually did quite a good job at distinguishing species that you would not think were different—by looking at their genitalia under a microscope six hours a day, seven days a week, until his eyesight was permanently impaired." The rest of his collection, about 4,300 specimens, was given to the Lausanne's Museum of Zoology in Switzerland.

Though professional lepidopterists did not take Nabokov's work seriously during his life, new genetic research supports Nabokov's hypothesis that a group of butterfly species, called the Polyommatus blues, came to the New World over the Bering Strait in five waves, eventually reaching Chile.

Many of Nabokov's fans have tried to ascribe literary value to his scientific papers, Gould notes. Conversely, others have claimed that his scientific work enriched his literary output. Gould advocates a third view, holding that the other two positions are examples of the post hoc ergo propter hoc fallacy. Rather than assuming that either side of Nabokov's work caused or stimulated the other, Gould proposes that both stemmed from Nabokov's love of detail, contemplation, and symmetry.

Politics and views
 Russian politics 

Nabokov was a classical liberal, in the tradition of his father, a liberal statesman who served in the Provisional Government following the February Revolution of 1917 as a member of the Constitutional Democratic Party. In Speak, Memory, Nabokov proudly recounted his father's campaigns against despotism and staunch opposition to capital punishment. Nabokov was a self-proclaimed "White Russian", and was, from its inception, a strong opponent of the Soviet government that came to power following the Bolshevik Revolution of October 1917.  In a poem he wrote as a teenager in 1917, he described Lenin's Bolsheviks as "grey rag-tag people".

Throughout his life, Nabokov would remain committed to the classical liberal political philosophy of his father, and equally opposed Tsarist autocracy, communism, and fascism.

Nabokov's father Vladimir Dmitrievich Nabokov was the most outspoken defender of Jewish rights in the Russian Empire, continuing in a family tradition that had been led by his own father, Dmitry Nabokov, who as Justice Minister under Tsar Alexander II had successfully blocked anti-semitic measures from being passed by the Interior Minister.  That family strain would continue in Vladimir Nabokov, who fiercely denounced anti-semitism in his writings, and in the 1930s Nabokov was able to escape Hitler's Germany only with the help of Russian Jewish émigrés who still had grateful memories of his family's defense of Jews in Tsarist times.

When asked, in 1969, whether he would like to revisit the land he had fled in 1918, now the Soviet Union, he replied: "There's nothing to look at.  New tenement houses and old churches do not interest me.  The hotels there are terrible. I detest the Soviet theater. Any palace in Italy is superior to the repainted abodes of the Tsars.  The village huts in the forbidden hinterland are as dismally poor as ever, and the wretched peasant flogs his wretched cart horse with the same wretched zest. As to my special northern landscape and the haunts of my childhood – well, I would not wish to contaminate their images preserved in my mind."

 American politics 
In the 1940s, as an émigré in America, Nabokov would stress the connection between American and English liberal democracy and the aspirations of the short-lived Russian provisional government. In 1942 he declared: "Democracy is humanity at its best ... it is the natural condition of every man ever since the human mind became conscious not only of the world but of itself." During the 1960s, in both letters and interviews, he reveals a profound contempt for the New Left movements, describing the protesters as "conformists" and "goofy hoodlums." In a 1967 interview, Nabokov stated that he refused to associate with supporters of Bolshevism or Tsarist autocracy but that he had "friends among intellectual constitutional monarchists as well as among intellectual social revolutionaries." Nabokov supported the Vietnam War effort and voiced admiration for both Presidents Lyndon B. Johnson and Richard Nixon. Racism against African-Americans appalled Nabokov, who touted Alexander Pushkin's multiracial background as an argument against segregation.

 Views on women writers 
Nabokov's wife Véra was his strongest supporter and assisted him throughout his life, but Nabokov admitted to having a "prejudice" against women writers. He wrote to Edmund Wilson, who had been making suggestions for his lectures: "I dislike Jane Austen, and am prejudiced, in fact against all women writers. They are in another class." But after rereading Austen's Mansfield Park he changed his mind and taught it in his literature course; he also praised Mary McCarthy's work and described Marina Tsvetaeva as a "poet of genius" in Speak, Memory. Although Véra worked as his personal translator and secretary, he made publicly known that his ideal translator would be male, and especially not a "Russian-born female". In the first chapter of Glory he attributes the protagonist's similar prejudice to the impressions made by children's writers like Lidiya Charski, and in the short story "The Admiralty Spire" deplores the posturing, snobbery, antisemitism, and cutesiness he considered characteristic of Russian women authors.

Personal life
Synesthesia
Nabokov was a self-described synesthete, who at a young age equated the number five with the color red. Aspects of synesthesia can be found in several of his works. His wife also exhibited synesthesia; like her husband, her mind's eye associated colors with particular letters. They discovered that Dmitri shared the trait, and moreover that the colors he associated with some letters were in some cases blends of his parents' hues—"which is as if genes were painting in aquarelle".

For some synesthetes, letters are not simply associated with certain colors, they are themselves colored. Nabokov frequently endowed his protagonists with a similar gift. In Bend Sinister, Krug comments on his perception of the word "loyalty" as like a golden fork lying out in the sun. In The Defense, Nabokov briefly mentions that the main character's father, a writer, found he was unable to complete a novel that he planned to write, becoming lost in the fabricated storyline by "starting with colors".  Many other subtle references are made in Nabokov's writing that can be traced back to his synesthesia. Many of his characters have a distinct "sensory appetite" reminiscent of synesthesia.

 Religion 
Nabokov was a religious agnostic. He was very open about, and received criticism for, his indifference to organized mysticism, to religion, and to any church.

 Sleep 
Nabokov was a notorious, lifelong insomniac who admitted unease at the prospect of sleep, once saying, "the night is always a giant". Later in life his insomnia was exacerbated by an enlarged prostate. Nabokov called sleep a "moronic fraternity", "mental torture", and a "nightly betrayal of reason, humanity, genius". Insomnia's impact on his work has been widely explored, and in 2017 Princeton University Press published a compilation of his dream diary entries, Insomniac Dreams: Experiments with Time by Vladimir Nabokov.

Chess problems
Nabokov spent considerable time during his exile composing chess problems, which he published in Germany's Russian émigré press, Poems and Problems (18 problems) and Speak, Memory (one). He describes the process of composing and constructing in his memoir: "The strain on the mind is formidable; the element of time drops out of one's consciousness". To him, the "originality, invention, conciseness, harmony, complexity, and splendid insincerity" of creating a chess problem was similar to that in any other art.

List of works

Notes

References

Further reading
Biography

Boyd, Brian. Vladimir Nabokov: The Russian Years. Princeton, N.J.: Princeton University Press, 1990.  (hardback) 1997.  (paperback). London: Chatto & Windus, 1990.  (hardback)

Field, Andrew. VN The Life and Art of Vladimir Nabokov. New York: Crown Publishers. 1986. 
Golla, Robert. Conversations with Vladimir Nabokov. Jackson: University Press of Mississippi. 2017. 
Parker, Stephen Jan. Understanding Vladimir Nabokov. Columbia: University of South Carolina Press. 1987. 
Proffer, Elendea, ed. Vladimir Nabokov: A Pictorial Biography. Ann Arbor, Mich.: Ardis, 1991.  (a collection of photographs)
Rivers, J.E., and Nicol, Charles.  Nabokov's Fifth Arc.  Austin, TX: University of Texas Press, 1982. .
Schiff, Stacy. Véra (Mrs. Vladimir Nabokov).  New York, NY.: Random House, 1999. .

Criticism

Livry, Anatoly. «Nabokov le Nietzschéen» , HERMANN, Paris, 2010 
Ливри, Анатолий. Физиология Сверхчеловека. Введение в третье тысячелетие СПб.: Алетейя, 2011 312 с. 

Bibliography
 Juliar, Michael. Vladimir Nabokov: A Descriptive Bibliography. New York: Garland Publishing, 1986. .
 Montalbán, Manuel Vázquez; Glasauer, Willi. Escenas de la Literatura Universal y Retratos de Grandes Autores. Barcelona: Círculo de Lectores, 1988.
 Alexandrov, Vladimir E., ed. The Garland Companion to Vladimir Nabokov. New York: Garland Publishing, 1995. .
 Funke, Sarah. Véra's Butterflies: First Editions by Vladimir Nabokov Inscribed to his Wife. New York: Glenn Horowitz Bookseller, 1999. .

Media adaptations
Peter Medak's short television film, Nabokov on Kafka, is a dramatisation of Nabokov's lectures on Franz Kafka's The Metamorphosis. The part of Nabokov is played by Christopher Plummer.
Nabokov makes three cameo appearances, at widely scattered points in his life, in W. G. Sebald's The Emigrants.
See Lolita.
In 1972 the novel King, Queen, Knave was released as a movie directed by Jerzy Skolimowski and starring Gina Lollobrigida, David Niven and John Moulder-Brown.
In 1978 the novel Despair was adapted by Tom Stoppard for the movie directed by Rainer Werner Fassbinder.
In 1986 his first novel Mary (in Russian Maschenka) was loosely adapted for the movie Maschenka, starring Cary Elwes.
The novel The Defense was adapted as a feature film, The Luzhin Defence, in 2000 by director Marleen Gorris.  The film starred John Turturro and Emily Watson.

Entomology
Johnson, Kurt, and Steve Coates. Nabokov's blues: The scientific odyssey of a literary genius. New York: McGraw-Hill.  (very accessibly written)
Sartori, Michel, ed. Les Papillons de Nabokov [The butterflies of Nabokov]. Lausanne: Musée cantonal de Zoologie, 1993.  (exhibition catalogue, primarily in English)
Zimmer, Dieter E. A Guide to Nabokov's Butterflies and Moths. Privately published, 2001.  (web page)

Other
Deroy, Chloé, Vladimir Nabokov, Icare russe et Phénix américain (2010). Dijon: EUD
Gezari, Janet K.; Wimsatt, W. K., "Vladimir Nabokov: More Chess Problems and the Novel", Yale French Studies, No. 58, In Memory of Jacques Ehrmann: Inside Play Outside Game (1979), pp. 102–115, Yale University Press.

External links

Vladimir-Nabokov.org – Site of the Vladimir Nabokov French Society, Enchanted Researchers (Société française Vladimir Nabokov : Les Chercheurs Enchantés).
"Nabokov under Glass" – New York Public Library exhibit.

The Atlantic Monthly – Review of Nabokov's Butterflies"The Life and Works of Vladimir Nabokov". The New York Public Library, profile and lectures. 2002

Vladimir Nabokov poetry 

Nabokov Online Journal 
"The problem with Nabokov". By Martin Amis 14 November 2009
"Talking about Nabokov" George Feifer, Russia Beyond the Headlines, 24 February 2010
"The Gay Nabokov". Salon'' Magazine 17 May 2000
BBC interviews 4 October 1969
Nabokov Bibliography: All About Vladimir Nabokov in Print
 
Vladmir Nabokov chess compositions at YACPDB
 The Nabokovian (International Vladimir Nabokovian Society)

 
1899 births
1977 deaths
20th-century American dramatists and playwrights
20th-century American novelists
20th-century American poets
20th-century Russian novelists
20th-century Russian poets
Alumni of Trinity College, Cambridge
American agnostics
American alternate history writers
American chess players
American entomologists
American literary critics
American male dramatists and playwrights
American male non-fiction writers
American male novelists
American male poets
American male short story writers
American translators
American writers of Russian descent
Chess composers
Cornell University faculty
English–Russian translators
Exophonic writers
French emigrants to the United States
Fyodor Dostoyevsky scholars
Emigrants from Nazi Germany to France
Harvard University staff
Emigrants from the Russian Empire to France
Emigrants from the Russian Empire to Germany
Emigrants from the Russian Empire to Switzerland
Emigrants from the Russian Empire to the United States
Russian lepidopterists
Literary translators
Naturalized citizens of the United States
Novelists from Massachusetts
Novelists from New York (state)
Novelists from Oregon
People associated with the American Museum of Natural History
People from Montreux
Postmodern writers
Russian people of Tatar descent
Baltic German people from the Russian Empire
Russian agnostics
Russian alternate history writers
Russian anti-communists
Russian chess players
Russian classical liberals
Russian literary critics
Russian male dramatists and playwrights
Russian male novelists
Russian male poets
Russian male short story writers
Russian memoirists
Russian refugees
Translators from English
Translators from French
Translators from Old East Slavic
Translators from Russian
Translators of Alexander Pushkin
Translators of The Tale of Igor's Campaign
Wellesley College faculty
Writers from Ashland, Oregon
Writers from Saint Petersburg
20th-century memoirists
20th-century Russian translators
20th-century American zoologists
20th-century American male writers
20th-century pseudonymous writers
Russian nobility